Heinrich Caro (February 13, 1834 in Posen, Prussia Germany  now Poznań, Poland – September 11, 1910 in Dresden), was a German Jewish chemist. 

He was a Sephardic Jew. He started his study of chemistry at the Friedrich Wilhelms University and later chemistry and dyeing in Berlin at the Royal Trades Institute. On the initiative of Nicolaus Druckenmüller, he trained as a calico printer in Germany, worked at Troost's calico printing works in Mülheim and then worked at the chemical firm Roberts, Dale in Manchester. During this time he improved the analysis of madder lake. After he returned to Germany he conducted his military service in 1857 and 1858. He worked in the laboratory of Jacques Meyer the father of Viktor Meyer in Berlin. In 1858 he was able to return to Mühlheim where he was not able to conduct his work. He joined the chemical firm Roberts, Dale in Manchester which he knew from his former visit.
During his time in England he improved the extraction of Mauveine from the residues of the synthesis and developed a synthesis  for aniline red and other dyes. 
In 1861 Caro returned to Germany and stayed at the laboratory of Robert Bunsen until he joined the Chemische Fabrik Dyckerhoff Clemm & Co. This chemical company later became BASF.

Caro was responsible for indigo research at BASF and he and Adolf von Baeyer synthesised the first indigo dye in 1878. Caro also patented the dye alizarin on behalf of BASF. He was the first to isolate acridine and "Caro's acid" (peroxymonosulfuric acid) is named after him.

See also
 Nikodem Caro, co-inventor of the Frank-Caro process to produce calcium cyanamide
 Linde-Frank-Caro process, a method to produce hydrogen from water gas

References

Further reading
.

External links 
 Heinrich Caro at scienceandsociety.co.uk
 Indigo at uni-bayreuth.de
 Indigo at econdoc.de

1834 births
1910 deaths
Scientists from Poznań
German Sephardi Jews
19th-century German chemists
People from the Grand Duchy of Posen
BASF people